The Electoral district of Brown Hill was a Legislative Assembly electorate in the state of Western Australia. It was named for a local land feature, and covered part of the Goldfields city of Boulder, near Kalgoorlie. It was created at the 1904 redistribution and was merged in 1911 with the neighbouring seat of Ivanhoe to form the Electoral district of Brown Hill-Ivanhoe. The only Member for Brown Hill was Thomas Bath of the Labor Party.

Members for Brown Hill

Election results

References

Brown Hill
Electoral district of Brown Hill
1904 establishments in Australia
1911 disestablishments in Australia
Constituencies disestablished in 1911
Constituencies established in 1904